Fighter Squadron 12 or VF-12 was an aviation unit of the United States Navy. Originally established on 9 January 1943, it was disestablished on 17 September 1945. It was the first US Navy squadron to be designated as VF-12.

Operational history

CAG-12 supported the Battle of the Treasury Islands from October-November before the Saratoga returned to Pearl Harbor on 30 November.

In January 1944 CAG-12 rejoined the Saratoga and supported the later phases of the Gilbert and Marshall Islands campaign and then carried out attacks against Japanese forces in the Indian Ocean before returning to Pearl Harbor in June.

Notable former members
Joseph C. (Jumpin' Joe) Clifton
Robert Dose
Hamilton McWhorter
Charles R. (Babe) Winterrowd
• Marvin Harper

See also
History of the United States Navy
List of inactive United States Navy aircraft squadrons
List of United States Navy aircraft squadrons

References

Strike fighter squadrons of the United States Navy